Sergei Panov may refer to:

 Sergei Panov (basketball) (born 1970), Russian basketball player
 Sergei Panov (footballer, born 1984), Russian football player
 Sergei Panov (footballer, born 1989), Russian football player